The Unini River is a river of Amazonas state in north-western Brazil.
It is a right tributary of the Rio Negro.

Course

The Unini River forms where the Água Preta stream joins the Preto River.
It then flows east to the Rio Negro, forming the border between the Rio Unini Extractive Reserve to the north and the Jaú National Park to the south.
The largest tributaries are the Papagaio, Paunini and Solimõezinho streams.

The river has generally acidic water with little suspended material.
The river and its tributaries make many meanders, creating great diversity of aquatic environments including lakes, rivers, creeks and flooded forests.
The river is lowest between October and November, and highest between June and July.

See also
List of rivers of Amazonas

References

Sources

Rivers of Amazonas (Brazilian state)
Tributaries of the Rio Negro (Amazon)